During the Parade of Nations at the opening ceremony of the 2020 Summer Paralympic Games, athletes from each participating country paraded in the Japan National Stadium, preceded by its flag and placard carrier. Each flag bearer had been chosen either by the nation's National Paralympic Committee (NPC) or by the athletes themselves.

For the first time ever, each NPC was invited to appoint one female and one male athlete to jointly carry their flag during the Opening Ceremony.

Parade order
In the announcement of the Refugee Paralympic Team, it was stated that the team would enter first in the parade of nations. The rest of the countries entered in  order, with the three final countries being the United States, France, and Japan, as the current host and the next two hosts of the Paralympic Games, France in 2024 and the United States in 2028, Paris and Los Angeles respectively.

Under the assumption that Afghanistan's athletes would be unable to compete in the Paralympics due to the Fall of Kabul to the Taliban, Afghanistan was represented in the Parade of Nations through a Office of the U.N. High Commissioner for Refugees (UNHCR) representative as a "sign of solidarity". However the UNHCR declined to name a representative and a volunteer will serve as Afghanistan's flagbearer. Afghanistan's athletes later confirmed their participation after the opening ceremony.

New Zealand's athletes also did not participate in the parade.

Solomon Islands had its national flag paraded at the opening ceremony, but ultimately the Solomon Islands team withdrew from the 2020 Summer Paralympics without coming to Japan.

Countries and flag bearers

Notes

Reviews
The names of each para-athlete who participated in the Opening Ceremony's Parade were projected and scrolled on the "digital signage" equivalent to the inner diameter of the stadium.

See also
 2020 Summer Olympics Parade of Nations

References

External links
 

Parade of Nations
Lists of Paralympic flag bearers
Parades in Japan